The 2017 FC Kaisar season is the club's first season back in the Kazakhstan Premier League, the highest tier of association football in Kazakhstan, after their relegation at the end of the 2015 season and 21st in total. Kaisar will also take part in the Kazakhstan Cup.

Squad

Transfers

Winter

In:

Out:

Summer

In:

Out:

Competitions

Kazakhstan Premier League

Results summary

Results by round

Results

League table

Kazakhstan Cup

Squad statistics

Appearances and goals

|-
|colspan="14"|Players away from Kaisar on loan:
|-
|colspan="14"|Players who left Kaisar during the season:

|}

Goal scorers

Disciplinary record

References

FC Kaisar seasons
Kaisar